Double Mooring is a thana of Chattogram District in Chattogram Division, Bangladesh.

Geography
It has 58780 households and total area 26.99 km2. Post code 4100.

Demographics
At the 1991 Bangladesh census, Double Mooring had a population of 319,945, of whom 185,888 were aged 18 or older. Males constituted 58.8% of the population, and females 41.2%.  Double Mooring had an average literacy rate of 56.6% (7+ years), against the national average of 32.4%.

See also
 Upazilas of Bangladesh
 Districts of Bangladesh
 Divisions of Bangladesh

References

Thanas of Chittagong District